The 1995 IIHF Asian Oceanic Junior U18 Championship was the 12th edition of the IIHF Asian Oceanic Junior U18 Championship. It took place between 20 and 23 March 1995 in Obihiro, Japan. The tournament was won by Japan, who claimed their eighth title by finishing first in the standings. Kazakhstan and China finished second and third respectively.

Standings

Fixtures
Reference

References

External links
International Ice Hockey Federation

IIHF Asian Oceanic U18 Championships
Asian
International ice hockey competitions hosted by Japan